Acacia carens is a shrub belonging to the genus Acacia. It is native to a small area on the Lesueur sandplain on the coast at the meeting of the Mid West and Wheatbelt regions of Western Australia.

Description
Like most species of Acacia it has phyllodes rather than true leaves. The few evergreen phyllodes are distantly spaced and continuous with the branches. It blooms between April and June producing yellow flowers.

Taxonomy
The species was first formally described by the botanist Bruce Maslin in 1995 as part of the work Acacia Miscellany Taxonomy of some Western Australian phyllocladinous and aphyllodinous taxa (Leguminosae: Mimosoideae).  as published in the journal Nuytsia. The species as reclassified as Racosperma carens in 2003 by Leslie Pedley but returned to the genus Acacia in 2006.

Distribution
The species is found in a small area between Coorow and Dandaragan where it grows it sandy gravelly soils on lateritic hills as part of heathland communities.

See also
List of Acacia species

References

carens
Acacias of Western Australia
Plants described in 1995
Taxa named by Bruce Maslin